National Route 460 is a national highway of Japan connecting Shibata, Niigata and Kashiwazaki, Niigata in Japan, with a total length of 120.5 km (74.88 mi).

References

National highways in Japan
Roads in Niigata Prefecture